Jack Wiseman was the chairman of the Birmingham City Football Club. He had been involved with the club for over 50 years, leading the organization during a time when the club's owner's bankruptcy threatened its continued existence. He died in August 2009.

References

External links 
 http://www.worldfootball.net/presseschau/eng-premier-league/_n1199562_jack-wiseman-1917-2009/

2009 deaths
English football chairmen and investors
English businesspeople
Year of birth missing